Waha field is an oil field located in the Libya Sirte basin and owned by the Waha Oil Company (WOC), which is a subsidiary of the National Oil Corporation (NOC). In 2005, ConocoPhillips and co-venturers reached an agreement with NOC to both return to its operations in Libya and to extend the Waha concession by another 25 years. ConocoPhillips operates the Waha fields with a 16.33% share in the project. NOC has the largest share of the Waha concession at 59.17%, and additional partners include Marathon Oil (16.33%), and Amerada Hess (8.17%).
The Waha oil field was captured by ISIS soldiers on March 5, 2015 but has since been recaptured.

Notes

External links

Waha Oil Company website
Official website (English)
GPCO Website
 اللجنة الشعبية العامة للمالية

Oil fields of Libya
Tripolitania